Sekhemre Shedtawy Sobekemsaf II was an Egyptian king  who reigned during the Second Intermediate Period, when Egypt was fragmented and ruled by multiple kings. He was once thought to belong to the late Thirteenth Dynasty, but is today believed to be placed as a king of the Seventeenth Dynasty of Egypt.

Attestation
His throne name, Sekhemre Shedtawy, means "Powerful is Re; Rescuer of the Two Lands." It is now believed by Egyptologists that Sobekemsaf II was the father of both Sekhemre-Wepmaat Intef and Nubkheperre Intef based on an inscription carved on a doorjamb discovered in the ruins of a 17th Dynasty temple at Gebel Antef in the early 1990s which was built under Nubkheperre Intef. The doorjamb mentions a king Sobekem[saf] as the father of Nubkheperre Intef/Antef VII--(Antef begotten of Sobekem...) He was in all likelihood the Prince Sobekemsaf who is attested as the son and designated successor of king Sobekemsaf I on Cairo Statue CG 386.

According to the Abbott Papyrus and the Leopold-Amherst Papyrus, which is dated to Year 16 of Ramesses IX, Sekhemre Shedtawy Sobekemsaf was buried along with his chief Queen Nubkhaes (II) in his royal tomb.

Placement in the 17th Dynasty
The German Egyptologist Daniel Polz, who rediscovered Nubkheperre Intef's tomb at Dra Abu el Naga', strongly maintains that Nubkheperre Intef ruled very late in the 17th Dynasty, which means that Sekhemre Wadjkhau Sobekemsaf (I) cannot have intervened between the Intef line of kings and the Ahmoside family of kings: Senakhtenre, Seqenenre and Kamose. Polz's hypothesis that Nubkheperre Intef ruled late in the 17th Dynasty is supported "by the evidence of the box of Minemhat, who was governor of Coptos" in Year 3 of Nubkheperre Intef "which was part of the funerary equipment of an Aqher who lived under Seqenenre [Tao]." This discovery strongly suggests that the reigns of Nubkheperre Intef and Seqenenre Tao were separated by only a few years in time rather than 15 to 20 years at a time when few pharaohs enjoyed long reigns in the 17th Dynasty. The late Middle Kingdom German Egyptologist Detlef Franke (1952–2007) also supported this view in an article which was published in 2008—a year after his death—where he wrote:
Contrary to Ryholt, I see no place for a king Sobekemsaf who ruled [Egypt] after Nubkheperra Antef.

Ryholt believed that Sekhemre Wadjkhaw Sobekemsaf intervened between the line of Intef kings and the accession of Senakhtenre—the first 17th Dynasty kings from the Ahmoside family line. Polz argues that Sekemre Wadjkhaw Sobekemsaf was instead the father of Sekhemre Shedtawy Sobekemsaf (II) and the grandfather of the Intef kings since a statue of Sekhemre Wadjkhaw Sobekemsaf shows that his eldest son was also named Sobekemsaf as Anthony Spalinger notes. This means that Sekhemre Wadjkhaw Sobekemsaf ruled on the throne before the Intef kings took power early in the 17th Dynasty—and that he would be Sobekemsaf I instead and the father of Sobekemsaf II. Since Sekhemre Shedtawy Sobekemsaf (II) himself is known to be the father of Nubkheperre Intef, this means that both he and Sobekemsaf I ruled Egypt before Sekhemre-Wepmaat Intef and Nubkheperre Intef assumed the throne. Sobekemsaf II would, therefore, be the son of Sobekemsaf I and the father of his two immediate successors: Sekhemre-Wepmaat Intef and Nubkheperre Intef.

The robbery of Sobekemsaf's tomb
The Abbott and Leopold-Amherst Papyruses, which are dated to Year 16 of Ramesses IX, state that this king's royal pyramid tomb was violated and destroyed by tomb robbers. The confessions and tomb robbery trials of the men responsible for the looting of Sekhemre Shedtawy Sobekemsaf's tomb are detailed in the latter papyrus which is dated to Year 16, III Peret day 22 of Ramesses IX. This document relates that a certain Amenpnufer, son of Anhernakhte, a stonemason from the Temple of Amun Re "fell into the habit of robbing the tombs [of noblemen in West Thebes] in company with the stonemason Hapiwer" and mentions that they robbed Sobekemsaf's tomb along with six other accomplices in Year 13 of Ramesses IX. Amenpnufer confesses that they 

In his trial, Amenpnufer testifies that he and his companions dug a tunnel into the king's pyramid with their copper tools: 

Amenpnufer states that the treasures taken from the two royal mummies amounted to "160 deben of gold" or 32 lbs (14.5 kg). The document ends with the conviction of the thieves—with a probable death sentence—and notes that a copy of the official trial transcripts was dispatched to Ramesses IX in Lower Egypt. Amenpnufer himself would have been sentenced to death by impalement, a punishment which "was reserved for [only] the most heinous crimes" in Ancient Egypt.

References

Bibliography
Kim Ryholt: The Political Situation in Egypt during the Second Intermediate Period c.1800–1550 B.C, Museum Tuscalanum Press, 1997. , 393 File 17/2

Further reading

16th-century BC Pharaohs
Pharaohs of the Seventeenth Dynasty of Egypt

arz:سوبيكيمساف الاول
yo:Sobekemsaf I